Geidar Mamedaliyev or Heydar Nuraddin oglu Mammadaliyev (born April 2, 1974, in Qubadlı, Azerbaijani SSR) is a Russian wrestler of Azerbaijani descent. Now his resident is in Yekaterinburg, Russia and he is head coach of Ural Wrestlers Team.

External links 
 

1974 births
Living people
Russian male sport wrestlers
Wrestlers at the 2004 Summer Olympics
Olympic wrestlers of Russia
Olympic silver medalists for Russia
Azerbaijani emigrants to Russia
Naturalised citizens of Russia
People from Qubadlı
Olympic medalists in wrestling
Medalists at the 2004 Summer Olympics
World Wrestling Championships medalists
Russian people of Azerbaijani descent